Chajim Fürst, aka Heinrich Chajim Fürst (born ca. 1580; died 1653 in Hamburg-Altona, Germany) was a merchant and court agent as well as an elder of the Jewish community of Hamburg. According to contemporary sources, Heinrich Chajim Fürst was also the richest Jew in Hamburg at the time.

References 

17th-century Danish businesspeople
17th-century German businesspeople
Court Jews
16th-century German Jews
Jewish merchants
People from Copenhagen
People from Altona, Hamburg
1592 births
1653 deaths
Jews from Hamburg